Kendall James Kremer (born July 16, 1957) is a former American football defensive tackle in the National Football League. He was drafted by the Kansas City Chiefs in the seventh round of the 1979 NFL Draft and played his entire career for them until 1984. He played college football at Ball State.

After his NFL career, Kremer became a sports agent.

References

1957 births
Living people
Sportspeople from Hammond, Indiana
Players of American football from Indiana
American football defensive tackles
American football defensive ends
Ball State Cardinals football players
Kansas City Chiefs players
American sports agents